Automotive industry in Argentina is the third largest in Latin America.

The Argentine automotive industry is regulated by the Association of Car Manufacturers, created in 1960, which includes automakers (cars, trucks and buses). Adefa is part of the International Automobile Manufacturers Association (OICA) based in Paris.

Some global companies are present in Argentina, including Fiat, Volkswagen, Ford, Iveco, General Motors, Nissan, Toyota, Scania, Mercedes-Benz, Renault, Honda, Groupe PSA (Peugeot-Citroen), etc., as well as national companies, in particular Materfer, ТАТ SA, Helvetica, Crespi, PurSang, etc. The latter produce modern replicas of classic cars.

References

Argentina
Industry in Argentina